The 2015 BNP Paribas Masters was a professional men's tennis tournament that was played on indoor hard courts. It was the 43rd edition of the tournament, and part of the World Tour Masters 1000 category of the 2015 ATP World Tour. It took take place at the Palais omnisports de Paris-Bercy in Paris, France, between 31 October and 8 November 2015. First-seeded Novak Djokovic won the singles title.

Points and prize money

Point distribution

Prize money

Singles main-draw entrants

Seeds

 1 Rankings are as of 26 October 2015

Other entrants
The following players received wildcards into the singles main draw:
  Pierre-Hugues Herbert
  Nicolas Mahut
  Lucas Pouille

The following players received entry from the qualifying draw:
  Aljaž Bedene
  Pablo Carreño Busta
  Marcel Granollers
  Dušan Lajović
  Édouard Roger-Vasselin
  Lukáš Rosol

The following player received entry as a lucky loser:
  Teymuraz Gabashvili

Withdrawals
Before the tournament
  Philipp Kohlschreiber → replaced by  Teymuraz Gabashvili
  Milos Raonic → replaced by  Jiří Veselý
  Tommy Robredo → replaced by  Adrian Mannarino

Retirements
  Kei Nishikori (side abdominal injury)

Doubles main-draw entrants

Seeds

 Rankings are as of 26 October 2015

Other entrants
The following pairs received wildcards into the doubles main draw:
  Fabrice Martin /  Lucas Pouille
  Paul-Henri Mathieu /  Benoît Paire

The following pair received entry as alternates:
  Pablo Cuevas /  Marcel Granollers

Withdrawals
Before the tournament
  Fabio Fognini (ankle injury)

Finals

Singles

  Novak Djokovic defeated  Andy Murray, 6–2, 6–4

Doubles

  Ivan Dodig /  Marcelo Melo defeated  Vasek Pospisil /  Jack Sock, 2–6, 6–3, [10–5]

References

External links
 Official website
 ATP tournament profile